After Sics is a compilation album from rappers Lord Infamous and  II Tone. It was released on January 27, 2009. It is Black Rain Entertainment.

Track listing

Intro 0:38
Ball Off (Lord Infamous) 4:26
Uuuuugh (Lord Infamous, II Tone, Mac Montese) 4:38
Gonna Make It Shine (Lord Infamous, II Tone, Mac Montese) 5:56
I'm Lookin (Lord Infamous, Mac Montese, Snuggles) 5:12
Fed Up (Mac Montese) 5:30
The Streets (Lord Infamous, II Tone, T-Rock) 4:45
High As A Fool (Lord Infamous, II Tone, T-Rock) 4:39
I'm Out (Area 51) 5:07
Grimey (II Tone) 5:02
This Ain't (Lord Infamous, Enigma, Big Stang) 3:56
Try Me (Lord Infamous, II Tone, Mac Montese, Santerria, Mad Keyz, Krysis) 4:30
All I Need (Lord Infamous, Q.B., II Tone, Mac Montese) 4:54
Work Dat Scale (Area 51, T-Rock) 4:03
You Know How I Ball (Big Stang) 4:09
Clubhouse Click (Lord Infamous, II Tone, Mac Montese, Tha Crunkaholics, Santerria, Big Stang) 3:51

Producers
Enigma – Tracks 2, 11, 15
Full Clip – Tracks 3, 16
St. Kittz – Tracks 4, 10
Maniak – Track 5
Young L.C. – Track 6
DJ Cree-Tracks – 7, 8, 9, 12, 14
Q.B. And Beat Dat Productions – Track 13

References

 
2009 compilation albums
Lord Infamous albums
Gangsta rap compilation albums